Farmingdale is an unincorporated community in Pennington County, in the U.S. state of South Dakota.

History
A post office called Farmingdale was established in 1887, and remained in operation until 1973. A large share of the early settlers being farmers caused the name to be selected.

References

Unincorporated communities in Pennington County, South Dakota
Unincorporated communities in South Dakota